Brian Olinger (born June 2, 1983) is a professional runner. He was sponsored by Reebok and specialized in the 3000 meter steeplechase with a personal record of 8:19.56.  He competed in the trials for the U.S. team in the 2007 World Championship.

Early life

Brian Olinger was born on June 2, 1983 in Fresno, Ohio where he was raised. He attended Ridgewood High School (West Lafayette, Ohio) in West Lafayette, Ohio. He is a state champion in the division 3 cross country 5K with a PR of 15:30 and a state champion in the 3200 in track with a PR of 9:26.  He has a 1600 PR of 4:21.

College
Brian Olinger walked onto the Ohio State cross country team his freshman year. His sophomore year he received a full scholarship.  The highlights of his College Career include being the 2004 Big Ten 5k champion.  He currently holds records at Ohio State University. He graduated with a degree in Human Ecology and Early Childhood Development.  His coach at OSU was two time Olympic Steeplechaser Robert Gary.

Professional career

He moved to Columbus, Ohio and in 2008 he made it to Olympic Trials final in 2008 but missed making the Olympic team by two places. He currently holds a PR in the mile of 4:00 and a 5k PR of 13:31.  He is currently sponsored by Reebok and is still coached by Robert Gary.  He has a brother, Christopher Olinger who recently ran track and Cross Country for OSU.
Brian Olinger placed 6th at the USATF 2011 12k Men's cross country, earning him a spot on the 2011 USATF cross country team to compete at the IAAF World Cross Country Championships.

Personal records 
Personal Bests-Indoor
 One mile-4:00.62                 Bloomington, Indiana               29/01/2010
 3,000-7:51.13                    Boston, MA                         7/02/2009
 5,000-13:45                      Seattle, Washington                02/2006

Personal Bests- Outdoor
 3,000 Steeplechas-8:19.29        Heusden-Zolder                     28/07/2007
 3,000-7:55.26                    Carson, CA                         20/05/2007
 5,000-13:31.21                   Walnut, CA                         18/04/2008
 10,000-28:07                     Walnut, CA                         05/2011

Competition record
 2000 Ohio State Division III State Cross Country Champ 
 2001 Ohio State Division III State Champion in the 3200 
 2004 Big Ten Outdoor 5,000 Meter Champ 
 2005 4th-place finish at USA Outdoor Championships 
 2008 6th-place finish at the USA Olympic Trials 
 2011 6th-place finish at the United States cross Country trials earning him a spot on the U.S. team to the world cross country 
championships in Spain, where he finished 76th.

References

 http://www.ohiostatebuckeyes.com/ViewArticle.dbml?SPSID=87770&SPID=10412&ATCLID=205093345&DB_OEM_ID=17300

External links
 
 Brian Olinger at USATF
 Direct athletics bio
 Ohio State articles: , 

Living people
1983 births
American male steeplechase runners
Ohio State University alumni
People from Coshocton County, Ohio
Sportspeople from Ohio